Cerro de Coxóm is a stratovolcano in Totonicapán in western Guatemala. The  volcano is located at the eastern edge of the valley of Quetzaltenango.

See also
 List of volcanoes in Guatemala

References 

Mountains of Guatemala
Stratovolcanoes of Guatemala